is a Japanese football player. She plays for Sanfrecce Hiroshima Regina and Japan national team.

Club career
Masuya was born in Matsushige, Tokushima on September 14, 1995. After graduating from JFA Academy Fukushima, she joined INAC Kobe Leonessa in 2014.

National team career
In September 2012, Masuya was selected Japan U-17 national team for 2012 U-17 World Cup. On September 13, 2014, when she was 18 years old, she debuted for Japan national team against Ghana. She played for Japan at 2014 Asian Games. She played 6 games and scored 2 goals. Japan won 2nd place. In 2018, she played at 2018 Asian Cup and Japan won the championship. She played 27 games and scored 6 goals for Japan until 2018.

National team statistics

International goals

References

External links 

 

Japan Football Association

1995 births
Living people
Association football people from Tokushima Prefecture
Japanese women's footballers
Japan women's international footballers
Women's association football forwards
Nadeshiko League players
INAC Kobe Leonessa players
Footballers at the 2014 Asian Games
Footballers at the 2018 Asian Games
Asian Games gold medalists for Japan
Asian Games silver medalists for Japan
Asian Games medalists in football
Medalists at the 2014 Asian Games
Medalists at the 2018 Asian Games